Roberto Vander (born Frans Robert Jan van der Hoek; September 20, 1950) is a Dutch-Chilean actor and singer.

Biography
After living in different Latin American countries such as Chile, Uruguay, Argentina, and Brazil, he settled in Mexico in 1980 after being a guest in the popular musical show Siempre en Domingo with Raúl Velasco where he presented his second album.

He toured for three years and was offered a role in the telenovela Cuna de lobos a soap opera that would become one of the greatest successes of its network Televisa. He later acted in Victoria and El precio de la fama. In the telenovela Senda de gloria ("Glorious path") he took the role of a Dutch-English villain and the opportunity to speak Dutch and English.

The success of Senda de gloria allowed him to obtain a role in Chilean telenovela Semidios produced by Universidad Católica de Chile's Canal 13 where he also sang the title song. For the same channel he made Bravo and returned to Mexico a year later to participate in a new version of Simplemente María and in La pícara soñadora, both soaps became hits in Latin America, Europe, Turkey and Russia. In 1992, Van Der returned to Chile to participate in two telenovelas and back to Mexico in 1994 he made Caminos cruzados. In 1995 he returned to Chile to make two telenovelas and started his own company Roberto Vander Prod to facilitate the access of Chilean media to actresses like Alicia Machado and other artists. In 1997 he participated in a telenovela with Televisa and next year he made Enséñame a querer with Venevisión, the most important television network in Venezuela.

He was interviewed by Dutch network NCRV in February 1999 in a 25-minute presentation from his home in Chile. This interview was broadcast on May 11 of the same year through the network Nederland 1. The same year he made Por tu amor in Mexico and in 2000 he made Milagros in Peru. In 2002 and 2003 he made two telenovelas for Televisa and was awarded the Azteca de Oro ("Golden Aztec") as Best Actor for his role in Salomé by the Asociación de Periodistas Mexicanos de Radio y Televisión ("Mexican association of radio and television journalists"). He made the new version of Rubí in 2004, this telenovela was considered as the best of the year and he was awarded El Sol de Oro ("Golden Sun") for his career and his role in this production and was nominated for the TVyNovelas award as "Best Supporting Actor".

Discography 
 1980 - En la esquina del café
 1988 - Roberto Vander
 1990 - María Sola

Filmography

Films

Television

References

External links
Roberto Vander

1950 births
Living people
People from Laren, North Holland
Mexican male telenovela actors
Dutch male film actors
Dutch emigrants to Mexico
Dutch male television actors
Naturalized citizens of Mexico
Naturalized citizens of Chile